The practice of human trophy collecting involves the acquisition of human body parts as trophy, usually as war trophy.  The intent may be to demonstrate dominance over the deceased (such as scalp-taking or forming necklaces of severed ears or teeth), to humiliate or intimidate the enemy (such as shrunken heads or skull cups), or in some rare cases to commemorate the deceased (such as the veneration of the relics of saints). It can be done to prove one's body count in battle, to boast one's prowess and achievements to peers, or as a status symbol of superior masculinity.  Psychopathic serial murderers' collection of their victims' body parts have also been described as a form of trophy-taking.

While older customs generally included the burial of human war trophies along with the collector, such items have been sold in modern times.

History
In the Old Testament, King Saul asked David to bring him one hundred Philistine foreskins as bride price for his daughter Michal. David and his men fought a battle, and he presented the king with two hundred.

Headhunting has been practised across the Americas, Europe, Asia, and Oceania for millennia. One analysis of the practice in early North American societies linked it to social distance from the victim.  Groups such as the Scythians collected the skulls of the vanquished to make a skull cup.

In the Japanese invasions of Korea (1592–1598), the noses and ears of slain Koreans and Chinese were collected and brought back to Japan, where they were placed in the Mimizuka monument in Kyoto. , it still stands.

In North America, it was common practice before, during or after the lynching of African-Americans for the European Americans involved to take souvenirs such as body parts, skin, bones, genitalia, etc.

In the United States, trophies were also acquired during conquest of indigenous lands by settlers and other Native American groups.  The scalp, skull, and wrist-bones of Little Crow, the Mdewakanton leader during the Minnesota hostilities of 1862, were obtained and displayed for decades at the Minnesota Historical Society as war trophies from Minnesota's bounty on the Santee Sioux.   The MHS established in the Constitution of the Minnesota Territory.  In another instance connected to battlefield success and to the American mutilation of Japanese war dead, President of the United States Franklin Roosevelt was given a gift of a letter-opener made of a Japanese soldier's arm by U.S. Representative Francis E. Walter in 1944. After a call by the Roman Catholic Archdiocese of Tokyo for "respect for the laws of humanity even in total war" Roosevelt ordered the item to be returned to its sender and recommended it be properly buried.

In addition to human body parts appearing in museums and artifact collections in the explicit context of historical conquest, they are also included for both putative and actual scientific reasons, particularly scientific racism establishing justification for dominance over subject races. The body of William Lanne, the last "full-blooded" Tasmanian Aboriginal man, was mutilated after his death in 1869 by William Crowther who later became the Premier of Tasmania, and Lanne's skull was sent to the Royal College of Surgeons in London to supposedly demonstrate "the improvement that takes place in the lower race when subjected to the effects of education and civilisation". Crowther's mutilation of Lanne proved immensely controversial in Tasmania.

During the German Empire's Herero and Namaqua genocide in German South West Africa at the beginning of the twentieth century, specimens of African body parts were obtained and taken to German museums and academic institutions, in some instances in the aftermath of medical experimentation on human subjects.  In 2011, when some of these items were returned to present-day Namibia, the rector of the University of Freiburg referred to the period of their acquisition as "one of the dark chapters in the history of European science".  Later in the century the Jewish skull collection and other medical resources were the result of Nazi Germany's human experimentation programs and other elements of the Holocaust.

The practice occurred during World War II and the Vietnam War. About 60% of the bodies of Japanese soldiers recovered in the Mariana Islands and returned to Japan lacked skulls. The practice continued up until the 20th century in the Balkans.

Other examples
 The Aghori Hindu sect in India collects human remains which have been consecrated to the Ganges river, making skull cups, or using the corpses as meditation tools.
 Tibetan Buddhists employ the kangling, a trumpet made from a human thighbone
 The scrotum of the last male Aboriginal Tasmanian, William Lanne, was crafted into a tobacco pouch after his death.
 During the Japanese invasions of Korea (1592–98) Japanese samurai took the noses of dead Koreans as trophies and as proofs of kills; these were pickled and sent back to Japan and buried in nose tombs
 In Wallace Terry's book, Bloods: An Oral History of the Vietnam War by Black Veterans, Specialist 5 Harold "Light Bulb" Bryant, Combat Engineer, 1st Cavalry Division, U.S. Army, An Khe, February 1966 – February 1967, relates:
Well, these white guys would sometimes take the dog-tag chain and fill that up with ears. For different reasons. They would take the ear off to make sure the VC was dead. And to confirm that they had a kill. And to put some notches on they guns.

If we were movin' through the jungle, they'd just put the bloody ear on the chain and stick the ear in their pocket and keep on going. Wouldn't take time to dry it off. Then when we get back, they would nail 'em up on the walls to our hootch, you know, as a trophy. They was rotten and stinkin' after awhile, and finally we make 'em take 'em down.

Trade
Trophy skulls with purported colonial-era ethnic engravings were widely sold online at various platforms. In 2005, Royal Malaysian Customs Department seized 16 human skulls with engravings that were purported to originate from northwest of West Kalimantan province, somewhere between Pontianak and the Sarawak border, and bound for an unknown buyer in Australia. These seized skulls were transferred to Sarawak State Museum in 2015.

Body-snatching 

Body-snatchings are sometimes conducted to retain a body part as a trophy.

See also
 Human trophy taking in Mesoamerica
 Maywand District murders
 Mokomokai: the much-traded and much-collected preserved tattooed heads of New Zealand Maori

References

External links